Kamal al-Din Isfahani (1172 – 1237) was a Persian writer of qasidas and other forms of poetry, who lived from 1172–1237. He and his father, the poet Jamal al-Din Muhammad Isfahani, were well known in Isfahan. He was murdered during the Mongol invasion and buried in a simple tomb. His tomb is in the Jouybareh district in Isfahan.

References

Sources 
 
 

1172 births
1237 deaths
12th-century Iranian people
13th-century Iranian people
12th-century Persian-language poets
13th-century Persian-language poets
Writers from Isfahan
Poets of the Khwarazmian Empire